This is a list of Croatian television related events from 2000.

Events
19 February - Goran Karan is selected to represent Croatia at the 2000 Eurovision Song Contest with his song "Kad zaspu anđeli". He is selected to be the eighth Croatian Eurovision entry during Dora held at the Crystal Ballroom of Hotel Kvarner in Opatija.

Debuts

Television shows

Ending this year

Births

Deaths

See also
2000 in Croatia